Tai Tam Harbour is a harbour in the innermost part of Tai Tam Bay in the southeastern part of Hong Kong Island, in the Southern District of Hong Kong. It is located at the estuary of Tai Tam Tuk.

Geography
Tai Tam Harbour is a narrow inlet to the inner bay area of Tai Tam Bay, in the south of Hong Kong Island. The harbour is about 200 m wide and 2km long, with an avaregae depth of about 3 m.

History
The harbour was once a gathering water of Tanka boat people.

Settlements
The southwestern part of the harbour is formed by a round-shaped peninsula, where the Red Hill and several low-rise upmarket residences and private housing estates are located, including the Redhill Peninsula, Red Hill Park, Turtle Cove, Le Palais and Villa Rosa.

Tai Tam Tuk Village, resited after the construction of Tai Tam Tuk Reservoir, is located at the estuary by the harbour, along the western shore of the northwest inner bay of Tai Tam Harbour.

Five villages are located along the western coast of Tai Tam Harbour. They are collectively known as 'The Five Lan Nai Wan Villages'.

At the time of the 1911 census, the population of Tai Tam Tuk was 76, the population of Lan Nai Wan was 4, the population of To Tei Wan was 54.

Features
Lan Nai Wan is bay in the west of Tai Tam Harbour. It is the site of Lan Nai Wan Village and Lin Hok Sin Koon temple.

Remains of military installations, including lookouts and pillboxes can be found among the Five Lan Nai Wan Villages.

Hong Kong International School has a campus by the western shore of Tai Tam Harbour, next to the Tai Tam Scout Centre. Five structures related to the Tai Tam Tuk Raw Water Pumping Station are also located in the vicinity, namely, the pumping station building, its chimney shaft, two staff quarters and the senior staff quarters. These 5 structures are collectively declared monuments as part of the "22 Historic Structures of Tai Tam Group of Reservoirs".

Section 7 of the Hong Kong Trail, from Tai Tam Road to To Tei Wan, follows the  northern and western outline of Tai Tam Harbour.

Nature
Part of the estuary is fully of mangrove.

The inner bay (northwest) of Tai Tam Harbour has been designated as a Site of Special Scientific Interest since 1975.

References

Further reading

External links

 Webpage about Lin Hok Sin Koon
 Tai Tam Obelisks at gwulo.com

Tai Tam
Ports and harbours of Hong Kong